Vermont Route 253 (VT 253) is a  state highway located entirely within the town of Canaan in Essex County, Vermont, in the United States. It extends from a junction with VT 102 and VT 114 to the Canadian border, where it continues into Quebec as Route 253. VT 253 is known in Canaan as Christian Hill Road.

Route description 

VT 253 begins at an intersection with VT 114 (Gale Street) and VT 102 in the town of Canaan near the New Hampshire state line. VT 253 is a northern continuation of VT 102, which also ends at the intersection with VT 114. VT 253 runs north along Christian Hill Road, passing the local cemetery near Kingsley Road. The route, a two-lane residential road, leaves downtown Canaan, passing a dam on the Connecticut River, which parallels VT 253. When nearby Power House Road merges in, VT 253 runs alongside the river, crossing a former railroad grade, which parallels another the northern side of the highway. Winding along the riverside across from US 3 in New Hampshire, the route turns away for short spurts from the railroad grade, passing some homes.

In a northern section of Canaan, VT 253 turns eastward along the river and enters Beecher Falls, reaching a four-way junction with a bridge over the Connecticut River. The bridge connects VT 253 and US 3. VT 253 turns north on the bridge's right-of-way, passing some homes before reaching the Beecher Falls–East Hereford Border Crossing. North of the border crossing, VT 253 runs north for a short distance, reaching the Quebec provincial line, where it continues north as Route 253.

Major intersections

References

External links

253
Transportation in Essex County, Vermont